In some individuals, the effect of oxygen on chronic obstructive pulmonary disease is to cause increased carbon dioxide retention, which may cause drowsiness, headaches, and in severe cases lack of respiration, which may lead to death. People with lung ailments or with central respiratory depression, who receive supplemental oxygen, require careful monitoring.

Signs and symptoms 
In individuals with chronic obstructive pulmonary disease and similar lung problems, the clinical features of oxygen toxicity are due to high carbon dioxide content in the blood (hypercapnia). This leads to drowsiness (narcosis), deranged acid-base balance due to respiratory acidosis, and death.

Causes
Many people with chronic obstructive pulmonary disease have a low partial pressure of oxygen in the blood and high partial pressure of carbon dioxide. Treatment with supplemental oxygen may improve their well-being; alternatively, in some this can lead to the adverse effect of elevating the carbon dioxide content in the blood (hypercapnia) to levels that may become toxic. With normal lung function, a stimulation to take another breath occurs when a patient has a slight rise in PaCO2. The slight rise in PaCO2 stimulates the respiratory centre in the brain, creating the impulse to take another breath. In some patients with a chronically high level of PaCO2, such as those with COPD, the stimulus and drive to breathe is caused by a decrease in PaO2. This is called a hypoxic drive. Thus, when oxygen is administered to patients with known CO2 retention, patients need to be watched for signs of hypoventilation, a decreased level of consciousness, and apnea.

Mechanism
In individuals with chronic obstructive pulmonary disease who receive supplemental oxygen, carbon dioxide accumulation may occur through two main mechanisms:
 Ventilation/perfusion matching: under-ventilated lung usually has a low oxygen content which leads to localized vasoconstriction limiting blood flow to that lung tissue. Supplemental oxygen abolishes this constriction, leading to poor ventilation/perfusion matching. This redistribution of blood to areas of the lung with poor ventilation reduces the amount of carbon dioxide eliminated from the system.
 The Haldane effect: most carbon dioxide is carried by the blood as bicarbonate, and deoxygenated hemoglobin promotes the production of bicarbonate. Increasing the amount of oxygen in the blood by administering supplemental oxygen reduces the amount of deoxygenated hemoglobin, and thus reduces the capacity of blood to carry carbon dioxide.

Prevention 
In people with chronic obstructive pulmonary disease, carbon dioxide toxicity can be prevented by careful control of the supplemental oxygen. In those with an acute exacerbation of COPD, hypoxic pulmonary vasoconstriction can improve gas exchange, and so just enough oxygen is given to maintain an oxygen saturation of 88%–92%.

References

Oxygen
Pulmonology